Emanuele Merisi (born 10 October 1972) is an Italian former professional swimmer, specialized in backstroke, who won a bronze medal in the 1996 Summer Olympics.

Career 
Merisi was born in Treviglio, province of Bergamo (Lombardy).

He began to swim at the age of 8, becoming a member of the Italian national team in 1989. His first important medal was at the European LC Championships 1993 in Sheffield, where he won a bronze medal in his favourite race, the 200 m backstroke. He repeated the result in the European LC Championships 1995, this time as a member of the 4×200 m freestyle relay.

Merisi presented at the 1996 Summer Olympics with the best time of the year in the 200 m backstroke, 1:57.70. This is still today the Italian record. In the race, however, he was not able to repeat this outstanding result: he gained only a bronze medal after Americans Brad Bridgewater and Tripp Schwenk, both with times largely superior to that time.

A talented and long-career swimmer, captain of Italian team in his last years, Merisi took part to two more editions of Summer Olympics, including 2000, in which he was ranked again amongst the favourites in 200 m backstroke and arrived 5th. His results include two more silver (1997 and 2000) and a bronze medal (1999) at the European Championships, all in the 200 m backstroke.

Personal bests 
100 m backstroke: 55.53
200 m backstroke: 1:57.70

References 

RAI Profile

External links
 
 
 
 

1972 births
Living people
People from Treviglio
Italian male swimmers
Italian male backstroke swimmers
Olympic swimmers of Italy
Swimmers at the 1992 Summer Olympics
Swimmers at the 1996 Summer Olympics
Swimmers at the 2000 Summer Olympics
Swimmers at the 2004 Summer Olympics
Olympic bronze medalists for Italy
Olympic bronze medalists in swimming
European Aquatics Championships medalists in swimming
Medalists at the 1996 Summer Olympics
Mediterranean Games gold medalists for Italy
Swimmers at the 1997 Mediterranean Games
Universiade medalists in swimming
Goodwill Games medalists in swimming
Mediterranean Games medalists in swimming
Universiade gold medalists for Italy
Universiade silver medalists for Italy
Universiade bronze medalists for Italy
Swimmers of Centro Sportivo Carabinieri
Medalists at the 1997 Summer Universiade
Competitors at the 1998 Goodwill Games
Sportspeople from the Province of Bergamo
20th-century Italian people